Econodynamics is an empirical science that studies emergences, motion and disappearance of value—a specific concept that is used for description of the processes of creation and distribution of wealth. Any economic theory deals with the  interpretation of economic processes based on the law of production of value, and various scientific approaches  differ in the choice of factors of production that determine, in the end, the creation of wealth. Marxists insist that only labor creates value, neoclassicists believe that, in addition to labor, capital must also be taken into account as the  important source of value. Econodynamics demonstrates that the statement about the productive power of capital is a hoax that hides the real role of labor and energy in the production of value. Econodynamics offers a more adequate  interpretation of economic growth and other phenomena.Econodynamics is based on the achievements of classical political economy  and neo-classical economics and has been using the methods of phenomenological science to investigate evolution of economic system. Econodynamics has been proposing  methods of analysis and forecasting of economic processes.  The comprehensive review of the problems of econodynamics is given recently by Vladimir Pokrovskii.

The Fundamentals

Value and production factors
Economic events are considered as processes of creation, motion and distribution of value that is firstly measured as exchange value. The factor interpretation of the exchange value, accepted by Econodynamics,  is based on the Smith-Marx's  labour theory of value, according to which efforts of workers     are the most  essential production factor. The theory is completed by the law of substitution, which states that the workers efforts in production of value could be substituted by work of production equipment driven with  outer  sources of power.    Econodynamics  introduces a concept of substitutive work , which is true  work of production equipment, to  characterize the functional role of machinery in production processes. The amount of production equipment is treated  as physical capital   , measured by its  value; the  variable    can be considered as a  capital service, a concept that was  discussed by Robert Solow. Production of value  can be considered as a function of the three production factors

Note that, in contrast to the conventional  neoclassical theory,   capital service    is considered to be an independent production factor, while  labour efforts   are replaced  with work of production equipment ,  not with   the passive production factor -- capital  .      

The  technological description assumes that work  and labor   should be considered as substituting each other, and the amount of production equipment, universally measured by its value , should be considered complementary to the work ( and ) of production equipment. Considering that the description should be valid for any starting point of time (the principle of universality), and assuming also that production is homogeneous, that is, the law of production of value does not change when the scale of production changes, we write the production function (1), which is the expression for  production of value,  in the form of two alternative relations 

where  and  factors.

The function of  production equipment  is to provide various means to attract labor  and substitutive  work   to production. The characteristic of this ability of capital is the amount of labor and energy per unit (by value) of production equipment

These quantities  determine the necessary amounts, respectively, of labor and productive energy consumption per unit (in value measure) of the equipment introduced, and, therefore,   are universal technological characteristics of the production equipment.   Note that the combination of technological coefficients (3) (in dimensionless form) determines the index  in the relations (2)

The technological index  in equation (2) appears to be connected with technological characteristics, which can be evaluated independently, and, therefore, in contrast to the neoclassical theory, the production function (2) does not contain arbitrary parameters. 

In is known that an increase in the main production capital leads to an increase in output, as it is reflected by  the first line of the relations (2), and this gave rise to the myth of the productive power of capital in a broad sense. If you have production shares, you get dividends, if the money is in the bank, you get interest.  However, money and stocks are only symbols that do not bring anything without a huge amount of work on the production of value within the framework of the capitalist organization of the national economy. The mystical power of capital to bring profit follows from the rules of distribution of the social product created by workers and substitute work. Only the efforts of people (taking into account the law of substitution) lead to the increase in value, that is, to the creation of wealth.

The absolute measure of value
The extension of  the labour theory of value  with the  law of substitution  allows us to generalize the Smith-Marx's  labour theory of value. and to  provide a better correspondence with empirical evidence.

In the Smith-Marx's theory of value, it is postulated that estimate of the efforts of workers  is  an ultimate  source of all created wealth (products), an absolute measure of value. When one accounts the effect of substitution  of workers' efforts with the true work of the production equipment, one could expect, that the total amount of work  on the production of value, which is the sum of properly accounted work of humans  and work of production equipment (substitutive work) , both measured in power units, could be an absolute measure of value, and one can write  

This relation allows one to estimate  the work needed for creation of wealth worth of one monetary units (energy content of monetary unit), which was done  for different cases. For example, the mean value of 'energy content' of dollar  of year 1996 in  years 1960 - 2000 is    J.  The values of the 'energy content' of monetary units that are used for accounting  change during the time, which shows that the used units of money do not present constant amounts of 'true' value. The absolute  measure of value can be  introduced as some amount of energy.

The direct methods of estimation of the substitutive work   are developing  for both past and future situations. For example, it is found that the total  amount of substitutive work  in the U.S. economy in 1999 can be estimated as  J per year. It is approximately one hundred times less than  total (primary) consumption of energy, which was about  J in 1999. However, the amount of primary energy (energy carriers), which is needed to provide this amount of substitutive work, is about  J. It is about 26% of total primary consumption of energy. Although one can easily find estimates of the total amount of primary energy carriers in the past, the biggest interest  is caused by possible assessments of the future quantity of energy going to the substitution of workers' efforts in processes of the production.  This is a problem, which has been considered specially.

Value, Utility and Entropy
Econodynamics establishes  relationship between the real wealth and abstract concepts of value, utility and entropy. The artificial products created by humans: buildings, machines, vehicles, sanitation, clothes, home appliances and so on, can be sorted and counted, so that one consider the amounts of quantities  in  natural units of measurement   and the prices of all products   to be given, so that one can define increase in value  of a stock of products  as

Due to dependence of prices on the amounts of products ,  one can hardly expect that form (6) is a total differential of any  function. In other words, one cannot say that  is a characteristic of the set of the products which is independent of the history of their creation. However, a function of a state, which is called utility function, can be introduced on the basis of relation (6). Indeed, the linear form (6)  can be multiplied by  a certain function, which is called integration factor ,  so that, instead of form (6), one  has a total differential of a new function 
	
The introduced function  is called utility function (objective), taking into account that the properties of function  coincide with those of the conventional utility function, which is introduced as {subjective} utility function connected with sensation of preference of one aggregate of products as against another. The above transformation of value to  utility reminds us transformation of heat to entropy in thermodynamics. In other terms, analogy between theory of utility and theory of heat  was discussed by von Neumann and Morgenstern   (see item 3.2.1 of their work).

The artificial  objects can be considered, as it was explained by Prigogine with collaborators, as  far-from-equilibrium objects (dissipative structures), and to create and maintain them,    the fluxes of matter and energy  are necessary to run  through the system. In our case, energy comes in the form of human efforts  and work of external sources  that can be used by means of the appropriate equipment. The creation of dissipative structures leads to decrease in entropy, and utility  can be considered as a close relation to entropy , though does not coincides with it. Considering that changes of internal energy in production of things can be neglected, one can write a thermodynamic relation 

Reconciliation of the two points of view on the phenomenon of  production  leads to a unified picture  that enables us to relate some aspects of our observations of economic phenomena to physical principles. A flux of information and work eventually determines new organisation of matter, which acquires forms of different commodities (complexity), whereby the production process is considered as a process of materialisation of information. The cost of materialisation of information is the work of production system. To maintain complexity in a thermodynamic system, fluxes of matter and energy must flow through the system.

Innovation and technological progress 

The earlier version of neoclassical production function ignores the technological progress at all.  It was introduced later into neo-classical theory by hand, as a time-dependent  factor  (growth accounting ).  In contrast to this, the technological progress appears  to be an internal property of the theory of ecodynamics. It is understood, first of all, as a progress in substitution of labour with work of production equipment in technological processes;  the theory gives  the expression  

The exogenous, according to the  neo-classical theory, technological progress  appears to be connected with the ratio of substitutive work to stock of capital , which can be considered as a  measure of technological progress itself, independent on the assumption made in the neo-classical theory. Sometimes it is convenient to use the non-dimensional  ratio of substitutive work to labour efforts  as a characteristic  of technological progress; this quantity can be interpreted as the number of 'mechanical workers', operating in the production processes, in line with an 'alive worker'. To the end  of the last century, this ratio reaches, for example, 12 for the USA.

Dynamics of development

Equations of evolution

Production of value (for year, for example)   is a money  estimate  of 'useful' changes in our environment (in the form of useful consumer goods and services), which can be connected with production factors. In result, it came to the set of equations of economic growth—the theory of evolution,  dubbed as the technological theory of social production. The theory is formulated  both in one-sector, and, using the Wassily Leontief's input-output model,   in multi-sector approximations. The data for the U.S. economy in the last century was used to justify the specification of the theory. It was demonstrated that the  substitution of worker's efforts  with work of the production equipment appears to be more adequate idea than the substitution of worker's efforts  with the amount of production equipment (capital in the neo-classical theory of economic growth);  work can be replaced only with work, not with capital. The theory demonstrates that the growth of production  is caused by achievements in technological consumption of labour and energy. The set of  equations determines three modes of economic development, depending on deficit of one of the factors: investment, labour or substitutive work. The changing of modes during the development reveals as short cycles in growth—the business cycles.

Applications

The theory can be applied to any  national economy; principles of consistent analysis and forecast are considered.  As an example, dynamics of Russian economy for  years 1960 - 2060  is considered in one-sector and three-sector approximations(see. Chapter 8 and 9). The elementary, three-branch model is used (see. Section 2.2.2, Table 2.2 in Chapter 2 and Section 9.5 in Chapter 9) for the description of dynamics of production (the expanded reproduction, in Marx's terms).

The theory allows, being based on the Angus Maddison"s estimates of the Gross World Product and World population, to restore the picture of development of mankind in the previous centuries. It was shown (see, Chapter 12). that one need the theory, based on the effect of substitution of worker's efforts with work of external power (two-factor theory), for the description of  the  evolution of production activity  from approximately year 1000 of our era. Before this time the substitution of human's efforts for outer work  practically was not noticeable, and one can use one-factor theory that is taking into  account only one production factor—efforts of workers. The theory is stated (see. section 1.3.1, the formula 1.1 in chapter 1 and section 12.3 in chapter 12).

The principle of evolution

The human population, as    any biological population obeys  energy principle of evolution, which states that  those populations and their associations (ecosystems) which can use the greater amount of energy from their environment have an advantage for survival. 
One can see   that the social production system tries to swallow all available resources, productive energy included.  This sentence can be considered as the principle of development of the production system and the human population itself, that has been developing as a self-organising system, trying to catch as much energy as possible. 

A lot of energy is used by a human population through improvements of technology, and the managing huge amount of energy allows the human population to survive in every climate zone of the Earth and expand itself in great measure. The enlargement of the human population from a very small group a million years ago till about 7 billion in year 2012 ought to be apparently connected with enhancement of the living conditions. Apparently, it is impossible to explain growth of number of human population, not referring on social production system—the means  of adopting the human to conditions of existence.

References

Labor
Theory of value (economics)
Empiricism